is a Japanese badminton player. He won a silver medal in the men's singles at the 2017 Summer Universiade and a bronze medal at the 2018 Asian Games. Nishimoto was part of Japan winning team at the 2012 Asian Junior Championships and at the 2017 Asia Mixed Team Championships.

Career

2013: First career final 
In 2013, Nishimoto reached the final of the Russia Open Grand Prix tournament, and became the runner-up after being defeated by Vladimir Ivanov of Russia.

2017: Summer Universiade silver 
In August, Nishimoto participated in the 2017 Summer Universiade, held in Taipei. He lost to Wang Tzu-wei in the final, 16–21, 15–21, clinching a silver medal.

2018: Asian Games bronze; 2 World Tour finals 
In January, Nishimoto reached his first BWF World Tour final, the 2018 Malaysia Masters. In the final, he lost to then-reigning world champion Viktor Axelsen in the final, 13–21, 23–21, 18–21 in three games.

Later in August, Nishimoto participated in the 2018 Asian Games, held in Jakarta. He lost to home favourite and eventual champion Jonatan Christie in the semi-final, losing 15–21, 21–15, 19–21 in three games, winning a bronze medal.

At the end of the year, Nishimoto made it to another final, the 2018 Hong Kong Open. He lost to Korea's Son Wan-ho in the final, losing 21–14, 17–21, 13–21 in an hour and 29 minutes.

2019–2020 
Kicking off the 2019 season, in March, Nishimoto made it to his first final of the year, the 2019 German Open. He lost in the final to compatriot Kento Momota in straight games, losing 10–21, 16–21.

The following year, at the 2020 Thailand Masters, Nishimoto lost to Hong Kong's Ng Ka Long in the final, losing 21–16, 13–21, 12–21 in three games.

2022: First international title 
In September, Nishimoto made it to his 7th career final, this time at his home event, the 2022 Japan Open. In the final, he beat 6th ranked and 3rd seed Chou Tien-chen in the final, winning 21–19, 21–23, 21–17 in rubber games. After the final, Nishimoto stated that he was "really happy" and also "a bit relieved" after clinching his first title, and thanked the home crowd for their support.

Achievements

Asian Games 
Men's singles

Summer Universiade 
Men's singles

BWF World Tour (1 title, 4 runners-up) 
The BWF World Tour, which was announced on 19 March 2017 and implemented in 2018, is a series of elite badminton tournaments sanctioned by the Badminton World Federation (BWF). The BWF World Tour is divided into levels of World Tour Finals, Super 1000, Super 750, Super 500, Super 300, and the BWF Tour Super 100.

Men's singles

BWF Superseries (1 runner-up) 
The BWF Superseries, which was launched on 14 December 2006 and implemented in 2007, was a series of elite badminton tournaments, sanctioned by the Badminton World Federation (BWF). BWF Superseries levels were Superseries and Superseries Premier. A season of Superseries consisted of twelve tournaments around the world that had been introduced since 2011. Successful players were invited to the Superseries Finals, which were held at the end of each year.

Men's singles

 BWF World Superseries Premier tournament
 BWF World Superseries tournament

BWF Grand Prix (1 runner-up) 
The BWF Grand Prix had two levels, the Grand Prix and Grand Prix Gold. It was a series of badminton tournaments sanctioned by the Badminton World Federation (BWF) and played between 2007 and 2017.

Men's singles

 BWF Grand Prix Gold tournament
 BWF Grand Prix tournament

References

External links 
 

1994 births
Living people
Sportspeople from Mie Prefecture
Japanese male badminton players
Badminton players at the 2018 Asian Games
Asian Games bronze medalists for Japan
Asian Games medalists in badminton
Medalists at the 2018 Asian Games
Universiade silver medalists for Japan
Universiade medalists in badminton
Medalists at the 2017 Summer Universiade
21st-century Japanese people